Mark Singleton (1919–1986) was a British film and television actor.

Partial filmography
 The Gambler and the Lady (1952) - Waiter at Jack of Spades (uncredited)
 Girdle of Gold (1952) - Waiter
 Gilbert Harding Speaking of Murder (1953) - 2nd Drama critic
 Take a Powder (1953) - (uncredited)
 Face the Music (1954) - Waiter
 You Lucky People! (1955) - Lt. Arthur Robson
 Moment of Indiscretion (1958) - (Jeweller)
 Innocent Meeting (1959) - (uncredited)
 No Safety Ahead (1959) - Fordham
 Top Floor Girl (1959) - (uncredited)
 Bluebeard's Ten Honeymoons (1960) - Advertising Clerk (uncredited)
 Compelled (1960) - Derek
 Transatlantic (1960) - Mills
 Sentenced for Life (1960) - Edward Thompson
 A Taste of Money (1960) - Detective
 The Court Martial of Major Keller (1961) - Captain Fuller
 Murder in Eden (film) (1961) - Arnold Woolf
 Part-Time Wife (1961) - Detective
 Partners in Crime (1961) - Shilton
 Enter Inspector Duval (1961) - Inspector Wilson
 Operation Snatch (1962) - Prime Minister's Secretary
 Mrs. Gibbons' Boys (1962) - Relief PC
 The Traitors (1962) - Venner
 Night of the Prowler (1962) - Anders
 Gang War (1962) - Tony Danton
 Death Is a Woman (1966) - Costello, Head of the Police
 Salt and Pepper (1968) - 'Fake' Home Secretary
 Can You Keep It Up for a Week? (1974) - Mr. Hobson
 Keep It Up Downstairs (1976) - Lord Cockshute
 Game for Vultures (1979) - Sir Benjamin Peckover (final film role)

References

External links
 

1919 births
1986 deaths
English male film actors
English male television actors
20th-century English male actors